None but the Lonely Heart is a 1944 American drama romance film which tells the story of a young Cockney drifter who returns home with no ambitions but finds that his family needs him. Adapted by Clifford Odets from the 1943 novel of the same title by Richard Llewellyn and directed by Odets, the movie stars Cary Grant, Ethel Barrymore, and Barry Fitzgerald.

The title of the film is taken from Tchaikovsky's song "None but the Lonely Heart", which is featured in the background music.

Plot

Ernie Mott is a restless, irresponsible, wandering Cockney with a good musical ear. On Armistice Day, Ernie visits the tomb of the Unknown Warrior in Westminster Abbey, which memorializes those who died in World War I, including his father. Ernie wants a better life but does not want to settle down or work for it. When he returns home, his mother Ma asks why he has returned after so long, and she gives him an ultimatum that he must stay home now or leave forever. He informs her that he will then be leaving next morning, and goes out to get a drink. He meets fellow musician Aggie Hunter outside the bar, but instead prefers the company of a gangster's fickle former wife, Ada Brantline. However, when Ernie becomes smitten with Ada, she rejects his offer of a date when he tells her he will be leaving town the next day.

The next morning, Ma tells her pawnbroker friend, Ike Weber, that she has cancer. Ma and Ernie get into another fight, but after he storms out, Ike shares with him that his mother needs him in her battle with cancer. Ernie returns and says that he will stay with her at home and help her run her shop.

A month passes, and Ernie continues to pursue Ada. However, when gangster Jim Mordinoy informs him that she is still his wife, Ernie does not believe Ada when she says that is a lie and he cuts her off socially. Ernie begins to notice the poverty surrounding him in London, and chooses to accept Mordinoy's offer to join his activities, even against Ada's pleas. Ernie begins to steal cars, and he is involved in a police chase until his car collides with a truck and explodes into flames. Ada implores him to run away with her, but he does not want to leave his dying mother.

When Ernie is eventually bailed out of jail by Ike, he finds out that after the police discovered Ernie's platinum cigarette case — his birthday gift from Ma — was stolen, the police arrested Ma and put her in prison. She begs for forgiveness for shaming the family, and dies in prison hospital. When he returns home, he learns via a letter from Ada that she decided to stay with Mordinoy because that would make her life easier. Ernie is crushed, and walks along the street until he gets to Aggie's door and walks in.

Cast

Production
None but the Lonely Heart and Sylvia Scarlett (1935) were the only two films in which Cary Grant used a Cockney accent, though that was not his original accent, as he was originally from Bristol.

RKO Pictures head Charles Koerner bought Richard Llewellyn's book as a starring vehicle for Cary Grant. Koerner also suggested that playwright Clifford Odets direct the picture. This was the first feature film Odets directed, and he would direct only one other picture during his career, The Story on Page One (1959). To secure Ethel Barrymore's availability to complete her scenes, RKO had to pay all the expenses incurred by temporarily closing the play The Corn Is Green, in which she was starring on Broadway.

According to The Hollywood Reporter, the East End London road set in this film was the largest and most complete external set constructed inside a sound stage at that time. The set measured 800 feet long and extended the length of two sound stages.

Reception
Lela Rogers, the mother of Ginger Rogers, denounced the script of None but the Lonely Heart at a House Committee on Un-American Activities hearing as a "perfect example of the propaganda that Communists like to inject" and accused Odets of being a Communist. Rogers cited the line spoken by Ernie to his mother, "you're not going to get me to work here and squeeze pennies out of little people who are poorer than I am," as an example of Communist propaganda. Hanns Eisler, who was nominated for an Academy Award for composing the film's score, was also interrogated by the House Committee on Un-American Activities and was designated as an unfriendly witness for his refusal to cooperate.

Box office
The film recorded a loss of $72,000.

Awards
17th Academy Awards:
Wins
 Best Actress in a Supporting Role: Ethel Barrymore
Nominations
 Best Actor: Cary Grant
 Best Film Editing: Roland Gross
 Best Music (Music Score of a Dramatic or Comedy Picture): Hanns Eisler and Constantin Bakaleinikoff

National Board of Review - 1944:

Wins

 Best Film

References

External links 
 
 
 
 
Review of film at Variety
 Historic reviews, photo gallery at CaryGrant.net

1944 films
1944 romantic drama films
American romantic drama films
American black-and-white films
Films featuring a Best Supporting Actress Academy Award-winning performance
Films set in London
American mystery films
Films based on British novels
1940s English-language films
1940s American films